Znamenka may refer to:
Znamenka (residence), a residence of the Nikolaevichi branch of the Romanov family, in Saint Petersburg, Russia; see Grand Duke Peter Nikolaevich of Russia
Znamenka, Russia (or Znamyonka), several inhabited localities in Russia
Znamianka, Kirovohrad Oblast (Znamenka), a city in Kirovohrad Oblast, Ukraine